Leiorhagium is a genus of small freshwater snails, aquatic gastropod mollusks in the family Tateidae.

Species
 Leiorhagium adioincola Haase & Zielske, 2015
 Leiorhagium ajie Haase & Bouchet, 1998
 Leiorhagium aremuum Haase & Zielske, 2015
 Leiorhagium cathartes Haase & Bouchet, 1998
 Leiorhagium clandestinum Haase & Zielske, 2015
 Leiorhagium douii Haase & Bouchet, 1998
 Leiorhagium granulum Haase & Bouchet, 1998
 Leiorhagium granum Haase & Bouchet, 1998
 Leiorhagium inplicatum Haase & Bouchet, 1998
 Leiorhagium kavuneva Haase & Bouchet, 1998
 Leiorhagium korngoldi Haase & Bouchet, 1998
 Leiorhagium monachum Haase & Bouchet, 1998
 Leiorhagium montfaouense Haase & Bouchet, 1998
 Leiorhagium mussorgskyi Haase & Bouchet, 1998
 Leiorhagium neteae Haase & Zielske, 2015
 Leiorhagium orokau Haase & Bouchet, 1998
 Leiorhagium ruali Haase & Bouchet, 1998
 Leiorhagium solemi Haase & Bouchet, 1998
 Leiorhagium supernum Haase & Bouchet, 1998
 Leiorhagium tectodentatum Haase & Bouchet, 1998
 Leiorhagium utriculatum Haase & Bouchet, 1998

References

 Haase M. & Bouchet P. (1998). Radiation of crenobiontic gastropods on an ancient continental island: the Hemistomia-clade in New-Caledonia (Gastropoda: Hydrobiidae). Hydrobiologia. 367: 43–129.

External links
 

Tateidae